A by-election to the French National Assembly was held in the Comoros on 12 July 1970, following the resignation of Saïd Ibrahim Ben Ali after he became Comorian Prime Minister. The result was a victory for Mohamed Dahalani of the List for the Fifth Republic.

Results

References

Comoros
Elections in the Comoros
1970 in the Comoros
By-elections to the National Assembly (France)
July 1970 events in Africa
Election and referendum articles with incomplete results